Amambai is a municipality located in the Brazilian state of Mato Grosso do Sul. Its population was 39,826 (2020) and its area is 4,202 km2.

References

Municipalities in Mato Grosso do Sul